

The Revolution Will Not Be Microwaved: Inside America's Underground Food Movements is a 2003 book by food activist Sandor Katz that examines how contemporary food production differs drastically from our recent past. The author challenges the corporate food industry as well as the way we think about food.  He suggests how traditional cultural practices of sustainable agriculture might subvert the corporate farm system.

See also
 Community-supported agriculture
 Family farms
 Farm-to-table cycle
 Fermented foods
 Food preservation
 Heirloom plants
 Local foods
 Organic farming
 Raw milk 
 Seed saving 
 Slow Food
 Urban agriculture
 Wild farming

References

External links
 The Revolution Will Not Be Microwaved, author's website
 Nature's Spoils: The underground food movement ferments revolution, Burkhard Bilger, The New Yorker, 22 November 2010
 Book review: TreeHugger
 Book review: Biodynamics.com

2003 non-fiction books
American non-fiction books
Food activism
Chelsea Green Publishing books